Thomas Kaye Bonney(b Tansor, Northamptonshire, 20 June 1782 - d Normanton, Rutland 7 April 1863) was Archdeacon of Leicester from 22 January 1831 until his death.

The son of Henry Kaye Bonney, Rector of Kings Cliffe, Northamptonshire, he was educated at Clare College, Cambridge. He was ordained in 1807. He held incumbencies at Coningsby, Lincolnshire, and Normanton, Rutland.

Notes

1782 births
Alumni of Clare College, Cambridge
Archdeacons of Leicester
1863 deaths
People from Tansor